USS Endurance is a name used more than once by the U.S. Navy:

 , a coastal minesweeper launched on 19 June 1941.
 , an auxiliary repair dry dock, delivered to the Navy on 1 February 1944.
 , a minesweeper launched 8 August 1952.

United States Navy ship names